Carlos Enrique Saucedo Urgel (born 11 September 1979, in Santa Cruz de la Sierra), commonly known as Carlos Saucedo, is a Bolivian footballer, who plays as a striker in the Liga de Fútbol Profesional Boliviano for Real Santa Cruz.

He has spent the majority of his career in Bolivia, playing for Oriente Petrolero, Bolívar, Blooming, The Strongest and Aurora, while also abroad in Ecuadorian side for Deportivo Quito, Colombian team Independiente Medellín, as well as Deportivo Saprissa of the Costa Rican Primera División.

International career
Saucedo made his international debut for the Bolivia national team on 22 August 2007, as a substitute for Augusto Andaveris, in a 1–0 away defeat against Ecuador, where he had a goal disallowed for offside.

International goals
Scores and results list Bolivia's goal tally first.

Career statistics

International

Club titles

References

External links
 
 
 
 
 

1979 births
Living people
Sportspeople from Santa Cruz de la Sierra
Bolivian footballers
Bolivian expatriate footballers
Bolivia international footballers
Club San José players
Oriente Petrolero players
Club Bolívar players
S.D. Quito footballers
Club Blooming players
The Strongest players
Club Aurora players
Club Real Potosí players
Guabirá players
Independiente Medellín footballers
Deportivo Saprissa players
Real Santa Cruz players
Liga FPD players
Bolivian Primera División players
Categoría Primera A players
Association football forwards
Bolivian expatriate sportspeople in Ecuador
Bolivian expatriate sportspeople in Colombia
Bolivian expatriate sportspeople in Costa Rica
Expatriate footballers in Ecuador
Expatriate footballers in Colombia
Expatriate footballers in Costa Rica